Qarah Qeytan (also Romanized as Qarah Qeyţān) is a village in Marzdaran Rural District, Marzdaran District, Sarakhs County, Razavi Khorasan Province, Iran. At the 2006 census, its population was 115, in 30 families.

The economy of this village depends on agriculture and animal husbandry. Carpet weaving with Baluchi designs is common among the Baluchis of this village.

There is an airport near Qarah Qeytan.

References 

Populated places in Sarakhs County